Kozica may refer to the following places: 

Kozica, Vrgorac, a village in the town of Vrgorac, Croatia
Kozica, Pljevlja, a village in the municipality of Pljevlja, Montenegro
Kozica (Fojnica), a village in the municipality of Fojnica, Bosnia and Herzegovina
Kozica (surname), surname